Robert Templeton (1802–1892) was an Irish naturalist, artist and entomologist .

Robert or Bobby Templeton may also refer to
 Bobby Templeton (footballer, born 1880) (1880–1919), Scottish footballer, played for several clubs and Scotland
 Bobby Templeton (footballer, born 1894) (1894–1967), Scottish footballer, played for and managed Hibernian F.C.
 Bob Templeton (born 1927), Australian footballer, played for Footscray
 Dink Templeton (Robert Lyman Templeton, 1897–1962), American track and field athlete, rugby union and American football player
 Robert Templeton (artist) (1929–1991), American artist
 Rob Templeton (born 1957), Australian cricketer